Perariyathavar is a 2015 Indian Malayalam film directed by Dr. Biju. The film revolves around two sweepers and the problems they encounter in life, depicting the agonies of the marginalised section of society. The film stars Suraj Venjaramoodu and Indrans. It won the National Film Award for Best Film on Environment Conservation/Preservation. Movie is credited as 200th film of Suraj. Suraj received the National Film Award for Best Actor for his performance.

Plot summary
The story revolves around a widowed father and son working as scavengers in Kollam Municipal Corporation and the harsh life they face. They belong to a section of society which is marginalized in the mainstream. The father is working as a temporary cleaning sweeper. Chami is his friend and fellow worker who belongs to a tribal community. They collect the garbage from the city streets into a vehicle and dump it at a rural village. Sometimes father takes his son along with him. During the journey in a trash vehicle, father and son see and experience the life of many nameless, faceless marginalised people, including themselves, in the midst of huge buildings and roaring vehicles.

Cast
 Suraj Venjaramoodu - Father 
 Indrans – Chami
 Master Govardhan – Son
 Nedumudi Venu – Workshop Master
 Sasi Kalinga - Band Master
 Sona Nair
 Seema G. Nair

Production
The film was produced by K Anilkumar under Ambalakkara Global Films. It is the second film produced by Anilkumar with Dr Biju after Akasathinte Niram (Color of Sky).

In an interview, Biju revealed that actors Dileep, Jayasurya, Biju Menon and Sreenivasan were approached to play the lead role. None of them accepted and the movie, therefore, was delayed for more than a year. Eventually, Biju chose Suraj Venjaramoodu for the role.

Awards
The film was awarded Best Film on Environment Conservation/Preservation Award at the 61st National Film Awards in 2013. Suraj Venjaramoodu was awarded the Best Actor Award. The noted filmmaker and jury chairman Saeed Mirza said in a press conference, "Suraj has played a municipal sweeper [in the film] but it is an incredibly dignified performance. He excels in comedy but in this film Suraj has brilliantly played a reticent character. I would not have been able to sleep had his name not been in the list of awardees."

List of awards

Festivals
 Official selection Montreal World Film Festival, Canada, August 2014
 Official selection competition Asia Pacific Screen Awards, 2014
 Official selection/competition Mumbai Film Festival, India, October 2014
 Official selection African Diaspora International Film Festival, New York, November 2014
 Official selection Jaipur International Film Festival, India, February 2014
 Official selection Fajr International Film festival, Tehran, Iran, 2015
 Official selection Kazan International Film Festival, Russia, 2015
 Official selection, Kolkata Film Festival, 2014
 Official selection Pune Film Festival, 2014
 Official Selection International film festival of Kerala, 2014
 New Generation film festival, Stuttgart, Germany, 2014
 Edmontan film festival, Canada, 2015

References

External links
 

2010s Malayalam-language films
Films featuring a Best Actor National Award-winning performance
2014 films
Films shot in Kollam
Films directed by Dr. Biju
Best Film on Environment Conservation/Preservation National Film Award winners